Harry Lee "Hal" Gerstle (July 12, 1880 – December 9, 1929) was a college football player and lumber dealer. He attended the Bingham Military School. Gerstle played for the Virginia Cavaliers football team.  He scored the only points against Penn in 1899. He was a member of Delta Kappa Epsilon fraternity. He married Carrie Glenn Whiteside. He was secretary and treasurer of the Gerstle Medicine Co. in Chattanooga.

References

Virginia Cavaliers football players
American football ends
1929 deaths
1880 births
Sportspeople from Chattanooga, Tennessee
19th-century players of American football
All-Southern college football players
American football halfbacks
People from Chattanooga, Tennessee